Matai Pukhuri is a pond located in the Khagrachhari District. It is sacred to the Tipra Indigenous community. This sacred pond is located in Nunchari Mouza in Mahalchari Upazila of the Khagrachhari District. This pond is one of the tourist attractions in Khagrachhari.

Location

This pond is located on mountains which are 500 feet (0.15 km) above sea level. The length of this sacred pond is about 1500 feet (0.46 km), with a width of 600 feet (0.18 km). This pond never dries up and gets filled again during rains or monsoon season. Local people believe that the God created this pond to meet the water needs of the people of this area. This pond is a blessing to the local people.

The Tirtha Mela or Tirtha Festival is held every year in this area where pilgrims come from different areas to visit this place. This pond is recognized as a pilgrimage place for Tripuri Indigenous People.

References

Khagrachhari District
Tourist attractions in Bangladesh